Granulomatous facial dermatitis is found in patients with persistent facial erythema involving one or more convex surfaces of the face, with lesions that show granulomatous reaction histologically.

See also
 List of cutaneous conditions

References

Acneiform eruptions
Face